Remik's Cube is the third album by You Say Party (formerly You Say Party! We Say Die!), released digital-only on Paper Bag Digital on August 26, 2008. Remik's Cube is a reworking of their previous album Lose All Time.

Track listing
 Five Year Plan (Vitaminsforyou 6th Year Remix) - 6:50
 Downtown Mayors Goodnight, Alley Kids Rule! (S-2 Beatdown Mayors Mix) - 3:30
 Opportunity (Montag's I Love Her Remix) - 3:41
 Teenage Hit Wonder (Re-styled by Camp America) - 2:58
 Monster (RAC Remix) - 3:59
 Like I Give A Care (The Octupus Project Remix) - 4:15
 Poison (Bocce Remix) - 2:37
 Moon (Wallpaper Remix) - 3:54
 Giants Hands (Kevvy Mental's Hand in Hand in Hand's Remix) - 3:07
 You're Almost There (DJ Rexford Remix) - 4:16
 Dancefloor Destroyer (Great Lenin's Ghost Remix) - 2:51
 Quiet World (Stop.Die.Resuscitate Remix) - 3:00

References

2008 remix albums
You Say Party albums
Paper Bag Records remix albums